In mathematics and mathematical physics, complex spacetime extends the traditional notion of spacetime described by real-valued space and time coordinates to complex-valued space and time coordinates. The notion is entirely mathematical with no physics implied, but should be seen as a tool, for instance, as exemplified by the Wick rotation.

Real and complex spaces

Mathematics
The complexification of a real vector space results in a complex vector space (over the complex number field). To "complexify" a space means extending ordinary scalar multiplication of vectors by real numbers to scalar multiplication by complex numbers. For complexified inner product spaces, the complex inner product on vectors replaces the ordinary real-valued inner product, an example of the latter being the dot product.

In mathematical physics, when we complexify a real coordinate space  we create a complex coordinate space , referred to in differential geometry as a "complex manifold".

A complex spacetime geometry refers to the metric tensor being complex, not spacetime itself.

Physics
The Minkowski space of special relativity (SR) and general relativity (GR) is a 4 dimensional "pseudo-Euclidean space" vector space. The spacetime underlying Albert Einstein's field equations, which mathematically describe gravitation, is a real 4 dimensional "Pseudo-Riemannian manifold".

In quantum mechanics, wave functions describing particles are complex-valued functions of real space and time variables. The set of all wavefunctions for a given system is an infinite-dimensional complex Hilbert space.

History
The notion of spacetime having more than four dimensions is of interest in its own mathematical right. Its appearance in physics can be rooted to attempts of unifying the fundamental interactions, originally gravity and electromagnetism. These ideas prevail in string theory and beyond. The idea of complex spacetime has received considerably less attention, but it has been considered in conjunction with the Lorentz–Dirac equation and the Maxwell equations.

In 1919, Theodor Kaluza posted his 5-dimensional extension of general relativity, to Albert Einstein, who was impressed with how the equations of electromagnetism emerged from Kaluza's theory. In 1926, Oskar Klein suggested that Kaluza's extra dimension might be "curled up" into an extremely small circle, as if a circular topology is hidden within every point in space. Instead of being another spatial dimension, the extra dimension could be thought of as an angle, which created a hyper-dimension as it spun through 360°. This 5d theory is named Kaluza–Klein theory.

In 1932, Hsin P. Soh of MIT, advised by Arthur Eddington, published a theory attempting to unifying gravitation and electromagnetism within a complex 4-dimensional Riemannian geometry. The line element ds2 is complex-valued, so that the real part corresponds to mass and gravitation, while the imaginary part with charge and electromagnetism. The usual space x, y, z and time t coordinates themselves are real and spacetime is not complex, but tangent spaces are allowed to be.

For several decades after publishing his general theory of relativity in 1915, Albert Einstein tried to unify gravity with electromagnetism, to create a unified field theory explaining both interactions. In the latter years of World War II, Albert Einstein began considering complex spacetime geometries of various kinds.

In 1953, Wolfgang Pauli generalised the Kaluza–Klein theory to a six-dimensional space, and (using dimensional reduction) derived the essentials of an   gauge theory (applied in quantum mechanics to the electroweak interaction), as if Klein's "curled up" circle had become the surface of an infinitesimal hypersphere.

In 1975, Jerzy Plebanski published "Some Solutions of Complex Albert Einstein Equations".

There have been attempts to formulate the Dirac equation in complex spacetime by analytic continuation.

See also
Construction of a complex null tetrad
Four-vector
Hilbert space
Twistor space
Spherical basis
Riemann–Silberstein vector

References

Further reading
 
 

Spacetime
Theory of relativity